Sergi Maestre García (born 18 November 1990) is a Spanish footballer who plays as a midfielder for Albacete Balompié.

Club career
Born in Barcelona, Catalonia, Maestre represented FC Barcelona and CF Damm as a youth. On 28 August 2019, after finishing his formation, he was loaned to Segunda División B side CD Lugo for the season.

In 2010, Maestre moved to Real Zaragoza and was assigned to the reserves in Tercera División. He helped in the side's promotion to the third division in his first campaign, before signing for RC Celta de Vigo's B-team in 2012.

Maestre continued to play in the third division in the following years, representing CF Badalona (two stints), UE Olot, UE Cornellà, Real Murcia and CD Badajoz. On 15 June 2021, he signed a two-year contract with Albacete Balompié in Primera División RFEF, and featured sparingly due to a knee injury as the club achieved promotion to Segunda División.

Maestre returned from injury in July 2022, and made his professional debut at the age of 31 on 4 September, coming on as a late substitute for Riki in a 2–1 away win over Málaga CF.

References

External links

1990 births
Living people
Footballers from Barcelona
Spanish footballers
Association football midfielders
Segunda División players
Primera Federación players
Segunda División B players
Tercera División players
CD Lugo players
Real Zaragoza B players
Celta de Vigo B players
CF Badalona players
UE Olot players
UE Cornellà players
Real Murcia players
CD Badajoz players
Albacete Balompié players